From Our Memento Box is the fifth extended play by South Korean girl group Fromis 9. The EP was released by Pledis Entertainment on June 27, 2022, and contains five tracks, including the lead single "Stay This Way". This is the final EP to feature member Jang Gyu-ri, who left the group on July 28, 2022.

Background and release
On June 6, 2022, Pledis Entertainment announced Fromis 9 would be releasing their fifth extended play titled From Our Memento Box, it was also announced that member Baek Ji-heon would be returning from her hiatus. A day later, the promotional schedule was released, followed by the release of the concept teaser video on June 8. On June 9, the track listing was released with "Stay This Way" announced as the lead single. On June 21, the highlight medley teaser video was released. Four days later, the music video teaser for "Stay This Way" was released.

Commercial performance
From Our Memento Box debuted at number one on South Korea's Circle Album Chart in the chart issue dated June 26 – July 2, 2022; on the monthly chart, the EP debuted at number five in the chart issue for June 2022 with overall of 165,937 copies sold. In Japan, the EP debuted at number 75 on the Billboard Japan Hot Albums in the chart issue dated July 6, 2022; on its component chart, the EP debuted at number 16 on Top Download Albums.

Promotion
On June 26, 2022, Pledis Entertainment announced the showcase for From Our Memento Box scheduled for June 27 would be cancelled after members Song Ha-young, Park Ji-won, Lee Seo-yeon, Lee Chae-young, and Baek Ji-heon got into a car accident.

Track listing

Charts

Weekly charts

Monthly charts

Year-end chart

Sales

Release history

References

2022 EPs
Fromis 9 EPs
Korean-language EPs
Hybe Corporation EPs